Don Bosco College (DBC) is situated in Ollukara, Mannuthy, near Thrissur city of Kerala in India. The college is affiliated to the University of Calicut. The college provides bachelor's degree courses in commerce, science and English.

Departments
 Management
 Commerce
 Electronics
 Computer Science
 English
 Malayalam
 Hindi
 Mathematics

Academic courses
This college offers both under graduate and post graduate courses.

Under-Graduate Courses
 B.A English
 B.B.A
 B.C.A
 B.Com Finance
 B.Com Computer Applications
 B.Com Banking
 B.Sc Computer Science
 B.Sc Electronics
 BSc Mathematics

Post-Graduate Courses
 M.Sc Electronics
 M.Com Finance

References

External links
 Official Website

Colleges affiliated with the University of Calicut
Colleges in Thrissur